Best in the World (2017) was a professional wrestling pay-per-view event produced by Ring of Honor (ROH). It took place at the Lowell Memorial Auditorium in Lowell, Massachusetts on June 23, 2017. It was the eighth annual ROH Best in the World event.

Storylines 
Best in the World featured professional wrestling matches that involved wrestlers from pre-existing scripted feuds, plots, and storylines that played out on ROH's primary television program, Ring of Honor Wrestling. Wrestlers portrayed heroes or villains as they followed a series of events that built tension and culminated in a wrestling match or series of matches.

Results

See also
 2017 in professional wrestling

References

External links
Official Ring of Honor website

2017 in professional wrestling
Professional wrestling in Massachusetts
Entertainment events in Massachusetts
Events in Lowell, Massachusetts
2017 in Massachusetts
2017
June 2017 events in the United States
2017 Ring of Honor pay-per-view events
History of Lowell, Massachusetts